Drăgănescu may refer to several entities in Romania:

Drăgănescu, a village in Mihăilești town, Giurgiu County
Mihai Drăgănescu, engineer

See also 
 Drăgan (disambiguation)